Arhythmorhynchus is a genus of parasitic worms belonging to the family Polymorphidae.

The species of this genus are found in Europe and Northern America.

Species:

Arhythmorhynchus capellae 
Arhythmorhynchus comptus 
Arhythmorhynchus distinctus

References

Polymorphidae
Acanthocephala genera